Hungary competed at the 2017 World Championships in Athletics in London, United Kingdom, from 4–13 August 2017.

Medalists

Results

Men
Track and road events

Field events

Women 
Track and road events

Field events

Combined events – Heptathlon

Key
Q = Qualified for the next round
q = Qualified for the next round as a fastest loser or, in field events, by position without achieving the qualifying target
NR = National record
PB = Personal best
SB = Season best
NM = No mark
N/A = Round not applicable for the event

References

Sources 

Nations at the 2017 World Championships in Athletics
World Championships in Athletics
Hungary at the World Championships in Athletics